The Ministry of Industry of the Republic of Serbia was the ministry in the Government of Serbia. The ministry was merged into the Ministry of Finance on 25 January 2001.

List of ministers

See also
 Ministry of Economy

Defunct government ministries of Serbia
1991 establishments in Serbia
Ministries established in 1991
2001 disestablishments in Serbia
Ministries disestablished in 2001
Serbia